, provisionally designated: , is a kilometer-sized asteroid and synchronous binary system, classified as near-Earth object and potentially hazardous asteroid of the Apollo group. It  became briefly notable upon its discovery in late August 2003, when media outlets played up a very preliminary report that it had a 1 in 250,000 chance of impacting into Earth on 21 March 2014.

Description 
 was discovered on 24 August 2003. It was added to the Sentry Risk Table on 30 August 2003. By 31 August 2003 (with an observation arc of 7 days) the odds of an impact on 21 March 2014 were already reduced to 1 in 1.7 million. The asteroid was removed from the Sentry Risk Table on 14 September 2003, indicating there is no risk of an impact by it in the next 100 years.

 safely passed within  of Earth on 26 March 2014. With an observation arc of 10 years and an orbital uncertainty of 0, its orbit and future close approaches are well-determined.

Preliminary reports 
On 3 September 2003 a NASA press release wrote, 

If it were to hit the Earth, it would be a major event, with an energy of approximately 350,000 megatons of TNT (1.5 ZJ), enough to cause global damage.

Sara Russell, a meteorite researcher at London's Natural History Museum, told the BBC on 2 September 2003 that she was not worried that  would be a danger; "The odds are very, very low ... We have to keep some kind of perspective", she said.

Binary system 
A minor-planet moon, provisionally designated , was first detected on 29 August 2021, by Petr Pravec, Peter Kušnirák, Kamil Hornoch, and others using photometric data from ESO's La Silla Observatory in Chile. The discovery was announced on 17 September 2021. The secondary measures a third the size of its primary (Ds/Dp-ratio of 0.33), resulting in a mean-diameter of approximately 310 meters. It is estimated to be tidally locked, orbiting  from the primary every 13.065 hours. The primary has a rotation period of  hours and a derived diameter of  kilometers, for a resulting effective diameter (system) of  kilometers.

In fiction 
 The asteroid was mentioned in Anonymous Rex (Les Reptilians) (2004) as the asteroid which the dinosaurs were counting on to destroy human civilization.
 The Korean drama My Love from the Star also mentions it as the asteroid that will allow Do Min-joon to travel back to his home planet.

References

External links 
 No, Asteroid 2003 QQ47 is NOT Going to Hit the Earth Next Week (Phil Plait 15 March 2014)
 
 
 

143649
143649
143649
143649
143649
20030824